Plagianthus  is a genus of flowering plants confined to New Zealand and the Chatham Islands. The familial placement of the genus was controversial for many years, but modern genetic studies show it definitely belongs in the Malvaceae subfamily Malvoideae. The name means "slanted flowers".

Description

The type species P. divaricatus is a divaricate shrub which grows at the edges of salt marshes. The other species, P. regius is a tree which in juvenile stage may be divaricate (subsp. regius) or not (subsp. chathamica).

These are the only species recognized currently. In the past, species from related genera such as Hoheria (New Zealand), Asterotrichion, Lawrencia and Gynatrix (Australia) were sometimes assigned to the genus. Instead, all these genera are now grouped in an informal "Plagianthus alliance".

References

External links 
 Malvaceae website, Plagianthus page

Flora of New Zealand
Malvoideae
Taxa named by Johann Reinhold Forster
Malvaceae genera